is the head coach of the Hiroshima Dragonflies U-15  in the Japanese B.League.

Head coaching record

|- 
| style="text-align:left;"|Yokohama B-Corsairs
| style="text-align:left;"|2017
|13||1||12|||| style="text-align:center;"|6th in Central|||-||-||-||
| style="text-align:center;"|-
|-
| style="text-align:left;"|Yokohama B-Corsairs
| style="text-align:left;"|2017-18
|41||14||27|||| style="text-align:center;"|6th in Central|||-||-||-||
| style="text-align:center;"|-
|-
| style="text-align:left;"|Hiroshima Dragonflies
| style="text-align:left;"|2018-19
|60||32||28|||| style="text-align:center;"|3rd in B2 Western|||-||-||-||
| style="text-align:center;"|-
|-

References

1983 births
Living people
Chiba University alumni
Hiroshima Dragonflies coaches
Japanese basketball coaches
Yokohama B-Corsairs coaches